The fortification is located in Băile Homorod, Romania, and it has as defense: ditch, berm and rampart.

See also
List of castra

External links
Roman castra from Romania - Google Maps / Earth

Notes

Roman legionary fortresses in Romania
Ancient history of Transylvania